The Roman Catholic Diocese of Xuzhou/Süchow is a diocese located in the city of Xuzhou (Jiangsu) in the Ecclesiastical province of Nanjing in China.

History
 July 1, 1931: Established as Apostolic Prefecture of Xuzhou 徐州 from the Apostolic Vicariate of Nanjing 南京
 June 18, 1935: Promoted as Apostolic Vicariate of Xuzhou 徐州
 April 11, 1946: Promoted as Diocese of Xuzhou 徐州

Leadership
 Bishops of Xuzhou 徐州 (Roman rite)
 Bishop Philip Côté, S.J. (April 11, 1946 – January 16, 1970)
 Bishop John Wang Renlei (2011–present)
 Vicars Apostolic of Xuzhou 徐州 (Roman Rite)
 Bishop Philip Côté, S.J. (June 18, 1935 – April 11, 1946)

References

 GCatholic.org
 Catholic Hierarchy

Roman Catholic dioceses in China
Christian organizations established in 1931
Roman Catholic dioceses and prelatures established in the 20th century
1931 establishments in China
Organizations based in Jiangsu
Religion in Jiangsu
Xuzhou